James Madison Nabrit III (June 11, 1932 – March 22, 2013) was an African American civil rights attorney who won several important decisions before the U.S. Supreme Court. He was also a long-time attorney for the NAACP Legal Defense Fund.

Biography 

Nabrit III was born in Houston, Texas to James Nabrit, Jr., a prominent civil rights attorney, law professor and later President of Howard University. He grew up in Washington, D.C., where he attended segregated public schools through part of high school. He finished high school at the Mount Hermon School for Boys, now Northfield Mount Hermon, in Massachusetts. Nabrit III graduated from Bates College in Lewiston, Maine in 1952 and Yale Law School in 1955. Nabrit began his career with the law firm of Reeves, Robinson & Duncan, served two years in the U.S. Army and then spent 30 years (1959–89) as an attorney with the NAACP Legal Defense and Educational Fund, Inc. He argued many important civil rights cases before the U.S. Supreme Court and various U.S. Court of Appeals, including Swann v. Charlotte-Mecklenburg Board of Education in 1972, and Shuttlesworth v. Birmingham in 1969. He argued 12 cases before the Supreme Court and won 9.

Nabrit died on March 22, 2013 in a hospital in Bethesda, Maryland of lung cancer at the age of 80.

See also 
List of Bates College people

References

External links 
DC Bar Bio
Bates College Bio
 1946 photographic portrait

1932 births
2013 deaths
African-American lawyers
People from Houston
People from Washington, D.C.
Presidents of Howard University
Bates College alumni
Activists for African-American civil rights
Yale University alumni
Activists from Texas
Northfield Mount Hermon School alumni
20th-century American lawyers
20th-century African-American people
21st-century African-American people